IDACORP, Inc is an electricity holding company, incorporated in Idaho with headquarters in Boise, Idaho. It comprises Idaho Power Company, IDACORP Financial and Ida-West Energy. It was formed October 1, 1998.

Energy mix
As of 2020, Hydroelectric power represents 41.7% of power generated, though they still use coal-fired and Natural gas.

^ Market purchases make up the remaining 7.4%

See also

Idaho Power
List of power stations in Idaho
Hydroelectric power plants in Idaho

References

External links

Companies listed on the New York Stock Exchange
Companies based in Idaho
1998 establishments in Idaho
Idaho Power
American companies established in 1998